Coelophysoidea were common dinosaurs of the Late Triassic and Early Jurassic periods. They were widespread geographically, probably living on all continents. Coelophysoids were all slender, carnivorous forms with a superficial similarity to the coelurosaurs, with which they were formerly classified, and some species had delicate cranial crests. Sizes range from about 1 to 6 m in length. It is unknown what kind of external covering coelophysoids had, and various artists have portrayed them as either scaly or feathered. Some species may have lived in packs, as inferred from sites where numerous individuals have been found together.

Examples of coelophysoids include Coelophysis, Procompsognathus and Liliensternus.  Most dinosaurs formerly referred to as being in the dubious taxon "Podokesauridae" are now classified as coelophysoids.

Classification
Despite their very early occurrence in the fossil record, coelophysoids have a number of derived features that separate them from primitive (basal) theropods. Among the most prominent of these derived features (apomorphies) is the way the upper jaw bones are connected (the premaxilla-maxilla articulation), which is flexible with a deep gap between the teeth in the two bones. A major source of disagreement among theropod experts is whether or not coelophysoids shared a more recent common ancestor with Ceratosauria (sensu stricto) than the ceratosaurs did with other theropods. Most recent analyses indicate the latter, that Coelophysoidea does not form a natural group with the ceratosaurians. Similarly, while Dilophosaurus and similar theropods have traditionally been classified as coelophysoids, several studies published in the late 2000s suggested that they may actually be more closely related to the tetanurans.

The cladogram below was recovered in a study by Matthew T. Carrano, John R. Hutchinson and Scott D. Sampson, 2005.

The cladogram below was recovered in a study by Martin D. Ezcurra and Gilles Cuny, 2007.

The cladogram below was recovered in a study by Ezcurra et al. (2020).

See also

 Timeline of coelophysoid research

References

Sources 
 Rauhut and Hungerbuhler (2000). "A review of European Triassic theropods." Gaia, 15: 75-88.
 Tykoski, R. S. (2005). "Anatomy, Ontogeny, and Phylogeny of Coelophysoid Theropods." Ph. D dissertation.
 Yates, A.M., 2006 (for 2005). "A new theropod dinosaur from the Early Jurassic of South Africa and its implications for the early evolution of theropods." Palaeontologia Africana, 41: 105-122.

 
Late Triassic dinosaurs
Early Jurassic dinosaurs
Norian first appearances
Early Jurassic extinctions